Karimganj Lok Sabha constituency is one of the 14 Lok Sabha constituencies in Assam state in north-eastern India, covering Karimganj and Hailakandi districts in the Barak Valley. This constituency is reserved for the candidates belonging to the scheduled castes.

Assembly segments
Karimganj Lok Sabha constituency is composed of the following assembly segments:

Members of Parliament

Election results

General elections 2019

General elections 2014

General elections 2009

General elections 2004

See also
 Karimganj district
 2019 Indian general election in Assam
 List of Constituencies of the Lok Sabha

References

External links
Karimganj lok sabha constituency election 2019 date and schedule

Lok Sabha constituencies in Assam
Karimganj district